The Trust Bank Limited, commonly known as The Trust Bank (TTB), is a commercial bank in Ghana. It is one of the twenty-seven (27) commercial banks licensed by the Bank of Ghana, the banking regulator in the country.

Overview
TTB is a medium-sized financial services provider in Ghana. , the bank's total assets were valued at approximately US$205 million (GHS:311.75 million), with shareholder's equity of about US$27 million (GHS:40.73 million).

History
The bank was founded in 1996 and commenced provision of banking services on 14 October 1996, following the issuance of a banking license by the Bank of Ghana. The Trust Bank is a retail bank that focuses on meeting the banking needs of small and medium-sized enterprises (SMEs).

Ownership
The shares of stock of TTB are owned by Ghanaian and International corporate investors. The shareholding in the bank is depicted in the table below:

Branch Network
, The Trust Bank maintains a network of twenty (20) networked branches at the following locations:

 Main Branch -  Reinsurance House, 68 Kwame Nkrumah Avenue, Accra
 Trust Towers Branch - Sobukwe Road (Farrar) Avenue, Accra
 Okofo House Branch - Kwame Nkrumah Avenue, Adabraka, Accra
 Kantamanto Branch - Tarzan House, Near Hotel De Horses, Accra
 Tesano Branch - Tesano, Accra
 Madina Branch - Old Road Taxi Rank, Accra
 Tema Community 1 Branch - Community 1, Tema
 Tema Main Branch - Hospital Road, Tema
 Sakumono Branch - Ocean Wave Hotel, Sakumono
 Post Office Square Branch - Opposite General Post Office, Accra
 Budumburam Branch - Budumburam, Central Region
 Harper Road Branch - Harper Road, Adum, Kumasi
 Suame Magazine Branch - Offinso Road, Suame, Kumasi
 Ashhtown Branch - Dr. Mensah Traffic Light, Kumasi
 Kwashieman Branch - Kwashieman, Accra
 Kissieman Branch - Kissieman, Near J. B. Plaza
 Dede Plaza Branch - Spintex Road, Accra
 Kwabenya Branch - Kwabenya, Accra
 Okponglo Branch - Okponglo, Accra
 Kasoa Branch - Kasoa

Takeover and merger
In December 2011, the Bank of Ghana approved the takeover of The Trust Bank by Ecobank Transnational and the merger of the acquired institution with Ecobank Ghana.

See also
 List of banks in Ghana
 Economy of Ghana

References

External links
 Website of The Trust Bank
  Website of Bank of Ghana
 List of Commercial Banks In Ghana
 Bank Lending Rates Still High

Banks of Ghana
Companies based in Accra
Banks established in 1996
Ghanaian companies established in 1996